The following highways are numbered 316:

Brazil
 BR-316

Canada
 Nova Scotia Route 316
 Prince Edward Island Route 316
 Saskatchewan Highway 316

China
 China National Highway 316

Costa Rica
 National Route 316

India
 National Highway 316 (India)

Japan
 Japan National Route 316

United States
  Connecticut Route 316
  Florida State Road 316 (former)
  Georgia State Route 316
  Illinois Route 316 (former)
  Indiana State Road 316 (former)
  Iowa Highway 316
  Kentucky Route 316
  Louisiana Highway 316
  Maryland Route 316
  Minnesota State Highway 316
  Mississippi Highway 316
 New York:
  New York State Route 316
  County Route 316 (Erie County, New York)
  Ohio State Route 316
  Pennsylvania Route 316
  Puerto Rico Highway 316
  Tennessee State Route 316
  Texas State Highway 316
  Texas State Highway Spur 316
  Farm to Market Road 316
  Utah State Route 316
  Virginia State Route 316
  Wyoming Highway 316